The Konkan Division is one of the six administrative divisions of Maharashtra state in India. It comprises the northern and central portions of the greater Konkani region, which were absorbed into Maharashtra owing to the States Reorganisation of India. Konkan Division is the western section of present-day Maharashtra, along the west coast of India. The two districts of the state capital Mumbai (Bombay) also fall in Konkan Division.

History of administrative districts in Konkan Division
There have been changes in the names of districts and has seen also the addition of newer districts after India gained Independence in 1947 and also after the state of Maharashtra was formed:
 Since 1947, the east-west tracts of Thane district on Salsette Island, starting with the City of Bandra, then Andheri, then finally Borivali to Dahisar were carved out and added to the former Bombay, now 'Mumbai,' district. Recently, the 'Mumbai' district was bifurcated into the Mumbai & Mumbai Suburban districts; the latter covers Salsette Island. 
 In 1961, the Konkan region became a part of the newly formed state of Maharashtra. Prior to this it was a part of Bombay Presidency which was split to form Gujarat and Maharashtra.
 Creation of the Sindhudurg from the southern areas of the Ratnagiri district.
 The erstwhile Kolaba district was renamed as Raigad.
 In 2014, Palghar district was carved out of Thane district with the inclusion of the northern parts of Thane district which include Palghar, Vada, Vikramgad, Jawhar, Mokhada, Dahanu, and Talasari Vasai talukas in the new district.

See also
 Coastal India
 Sapta Konkan
 Aparanta

References

External links

 
Divisions of Maharashtra